The Simpsons is an American television series created by Matt Groening.

The Simpsons may also refer to:
 Simpson family, the main family on The Simpsons
 The Simpsons (franchise)
 The Simpsons Movie, a 2007 film

Gaming
 The Simpsons (pinball), a 1990 pinball game
 The Simpsons (arcade game), a 1991 arcade game
 The Simpsons Game, a 2007 video game

Other
 The Simpsons Ride, as of 2008, a theme park attraction housed at Universal Studios Florida and Universal Studios Hollywood

See also
 Simpson (disambiguation)
 Simpsons (department store), Canadian department store
 Simpsons of Piccadilly, a clothing store in London
 Simpson's (disambiguation)
 Simpson's-in-the-Strand, a restaurant in London 
 Simpson's Tavern, a pub and restaurant in the City of London 
 Simpson's Hospital, Dublin, Ireland, a nursing home